Clinical Medicine & Research is an open-access, peer-reviewed, academic journal of clinical medicine published by the Marshfield Clinic Research Foundation. The journal is currently edited by Adedayo A. Onitilo (Marshfield Clinic).

Abstracting and indexing
The journal is abstracted and indexed in the following bibliographic databases:

References

External links

Publications established in 2003
Clinical practice journals
English-language journals
Open access journals
Quarterly journals